Scharffia is a genus of East African araneomorph spiders in the family Cyatholipidae, and was first described by C. E. Griswold in 1997.

Species
 it contains four species:
Scharffia chinja Griswold, 1997 (type) – Tanzania
Scharffia holmi Griswold, 1997 – Kenya
Scharffia nyasa Griswold, 1997 – Malawi
Scharffia rossi Griswold, 1997 – Tanzania

References

Araneomorphae genera
Cyatholipidae
Spiders of Africa